is an early 13th-century Japanese text. One volume in length, it is the oldest existing Japanese text on prose literary criticism. The author is unknown, but the leading candidate proposed is Shunzei's Daughter. Other candidates who have been proposed include her maternal grandfather Shunzei himself and the monk .

Composition
Composition occurred between 1200 and 1202.

The author is unknown. Hypotheses include Fujiwara no Shunzei ( -1204); his granddaughter, often called "Shunzei's Daughter" ( - 1252); Jōkaku (1147-1226); and Shikishi Naishinnō (1149-1201); but strongest support is for Shunzei's daughter.

Contents
The volume is composed of four distinct sections: a preface, literary criticism, poetic criticism, and a discussion on prominent literary women.

The preface introduces an 83-year-old woman on a trip. She stops to rest at a house, where she writes down the conversation of a group of women talking about literature, creating a frame tale excuse to write the volume. The frame tale itself has many elements from monogatari of the time.

The literary criticism covers 28 stories, including Genji Monogatari, Sagoromo Monogatari (ja), Yoru no Nezame, Hamamatsu Chūnagon Monogatari, and Torikaebaya Monogatari. The others mostly do not exist anymore.

For poetic criticism, it covers Ise Monogatari, Yamato Monogatari, Man'yōshū, and private and imperial collections. The editor laments the lack of women compilers in the collections.

It then goes on to discuss the ability and upbringing of a number of prominent women: Ono no Komachi, Sei Shōnagon, Izumi Shikibu, Akazome Emon, Murasaki Shikibu and others.

The text is particularly valuable as a resource, since it includes descriptions of a number of either completely or partially lost texts.

See also
 Fūyō Wakashū, a collection of poetry from various literary sources, many of which are no longer extant

References

Bibliography

Further reading

Early Middle Japanese texts

Books of literary criticism
Works of unknown authorship
Japanese literary criticism